Philippe Prieur (born 2 March 1960 in Amboise, France) is a former professional footballer. He played as a striker. He was a member of the French squad that won a silver medal at the 1987 Mediterranean Games.

External links
Philippe Prieur profile at chamoisfc79.fr

1960 births
Living people
People from Amboise
French footballers
Association football forwards
Paris FC players
Le Havre AC players
Stade Malherbe Caen players
FC Mulhouse players
Valenciennes FC players
Chamois Niortais F.C. players
Bourges 18 players
Ligue 1 players
Ligue 2 players
Lyon La Duchère players
Competitors at the 1987 Mediterranean Games
Mediterranean Games silver medalists for France
Sportspeople from Indre-et-Loire
Mediterranean Games medalists in football
Footballers from Centre-Val de Loire